Gustavo Adolfo Bell Lemus (born 1 February 1957) is a Colombian politician, lawyer, economist and diplomat who served as vice president of Colombia from 1998–2002 under the administration of Andrés Pastrana Arango, during which time he also served concurrently as High Commissioner for Human Rights of Colombia and as Minister of National Defence between 2001 and 2002. He also served as the Colombian ambassador to Cuba from 2011 to 2017. In 1992, as the 53rd Governor of Atlántico, he became the first popularly elected Governor of the Department following the enactment of the 1991 Colombian Constitution.

Career

Education
Bell attended the Pontifical Xavierian University where he obtained a double degree in Laws and Socioeconomics. He completed graduate studies at the University of the Andes on a Constitutional Bicentenary scholarship from the Bank of the Republic [Colombia], the Escuela de Estudios Hispano-Americanos at Seville on a research scholarship from Spain's Ministry of Foreign Affairs and Cooperation, and St Antony's College, Oxford on a British Council scholarship, where he also obtained a Ph.D in Modern History.

In addition to his academic studies, Bell was one of the founding members and part of the faculty of the University of the North in Barranquilla.

Journalism
Bell began his work in journalism in El Heraldo, and quickly rose to become one of the most influential journalist in northern Colombia. While working as Executive Editor of El Heraldo, Bell suffered an assassination attempt but escaped unharmed.

Governorship
In 1991 Bell run for governor of the Atlántico Department as an independent candidate, he became the first elected governor by popular vote of this Department for the period between 1992-1994. (governors in Colombia were appointed by the President before the constitution of 1991)

Vice Presidency (1998-2002) 
After spending three years studying in the United Kingdom, Bell returned to Colombia in 1997 and joined the presidential campaign of Andrés Pastrana. Pastrana offered him the Vice Presidency of Colombia, They were elected for the 1998-2002 presidential period.

Vice President Bell was in charge of the Colombian Office for Human Rights issues between 1998 and 2001, year in which President Pastrana also appointed him the Ministry of National Defence.

Ambassadorship
On 29 October 2010, President Juan Manuel Santos Calderón designated Bell to be Ambassador Extraordinary and Plenipotentiary of Colombia to the Republic of Cuba stating "I think [a] better ambassador to Cuba would not be found. We want to maintain a special relationship with Cuba and therefore we will send an ambassador of high carat, as Dr. Bell". On 7 March 2011, Bell was sworn in by President Santos on as Ambassador to Cuba in a ceremony at the Palace of Nariño. Bell served as ambassador until 2017 and was succeeded by Araceli Morales López.

Personal life
Bell was married to María Mercedes De La Espriella and has one daughter named María Alexandra.

References

people daily - Gustavo Bell
medios para la paz - Atentado contra la vida de Gustavo Bell 
El Heraldo - MARIA MERCEDES De La Espriella de Bell

|-

|-

|-

|-

1957 births
Living people
People from Barranquilla
Pontifical Xavierian University alumni
Alumni of St Antony's College, Oxford
Colombian governors
20th-century Colombian historians
Colombian journalists
Male journalists
Colombian Conservative Party politicians
Governors of Atlántico Department
Vice presidents of Colombia
Colombian Ministers of Defense
Ambassadors of Colombia to Cuba